Wolfgang Patzke (24 February 1959 – 8 May 2016) was a German football player.

References

1959 births
2016 deaths
German footballers
Germany under-21 international footballers
Rot-Weiss Essen players
SG Wattenscheid 09 players
VfL Bochum players
Bayer 04 Leverkusen players
FC Schalke 04 players
Hertha BSC players
Bundesliga players
2. Bundesliga players
Sportspeople from Mülheim
Association football midfielders
Footballers from North Rhine-Westphalia
20th-century German people